The Joe, the leyend (Spanish: El Joe, la leyenda) is a 119-episode Colombian television biopic. It is inspired by the life and works of singer Joe Arroyo. Jair Romero starred as Joe Arroyo. Mauro Castillo and Estefanía Borges also starred as Wilson Manyoma and Jacqueline Ramón, respectively. Produced by Guillermo Restrepo, the TV show was a RCN Televisión production. It was originally broadcast from 30 May to 20 December 2011.

Positively reviewed in Colombia, El Joe, la leyenda was honored with the Premios India Catalina award for best soap opera.

Plot 
Joe Arroyo started his singing career in the 1970s, with local performances in the Colombian Caribbean region. Musician Julio Estrada (aka Fruko) discovered Arroyo's talent during Barranquilla's Carnival and asked him to be a part of the Fruko y sus Tesos band.  He would then go on to form the orchestra La Verdad in 1981.

Arroyo is depicted in the first episodes as a young, attractive and courageous man that during a carnival falls in love with Jaqueline Ramón, daughter of the owner of a local music label. Arroyo is soon engulfed in a love triangle.

A sad part of Arroyo's life was captured in the series when his mother Ángela died.

The serial also focuses on Arroyo's struggle to succeed in the musical business and uses the lyrics from his most popular songs as a narrative device throughout the episodes.

Cast 
 Jair Romero as Joe Arroyo
 Mauro Castillo as Wilson Manyoma
 Estefanía Borge as Jacqueline Ramón
 Kimberly Reyes as Luz Mary
 Carlos Mariño as Enrrique Carrillo
 Walter Días as Piper Pimienta
 Diana Wiswell as Daniela
 Alejandro Palacio as Pepe Leal
 Víctor Hugo Trespalacios as Eugenio Trespalacios
 Jeymmy Paola Vargas as Adela Martelo
 Ana Lucía Silva as María Inés
 Diego Martín Vásquez as Gustavo García
 Juan Alfonso Baptista as Iván Nava
 Ilja Rosendahl as Dr Henríquez
 Felipe Calero as Chelito de Castro
 María Isabel Henao as Nancy Bernal de Carrillo
 Patricia Tamayo as Myriam Roca
 Martín Armenta as Roberto Solano
 Sebastián Sánchez as Juventino Requejo
 Diego Vásquez as Julio Ernesto Estrada "Fruko"
 Andrés Suárez as Francisco Vergara
 Horacio Tavera as Pedro Spirko
 Carmenza Gómez as La tía 'Ceci'
 Eileen Roca as Rosario
 Ramses Ramos as Víctor del Real
 Fernando Arévalo as Polo
 Magali Caicedo as Ángela González
 Santiago Miniño as Javier

Production 

Screenwriter Andrés Salgado started working on the project in 1999.  Artist Joe Arroyo gave permission to the serial and personally recounted some of the anecdotes to the writing team.

Many locations around five cities (Cartagena, Barranquilla, Medellín, Bogotá and San Basilio de Palenque) were used for filming.

References 

Colombian television series
Joe Arroyo albums
2011 Colombian television series debuts
2011 Colombian television series endings